"West" is a rock song by the indie rock band The Alice Rose, composed by JoDee Purkeypile, and released on the 2006 album Phonographic Memory. It was named NPR's "Song of the Day" on November 27, 2006.  David Brown, host of KUT FM's "Texas Music Matters", called the song "oddly warm and instantly memorable". In 2008, the song was featured in the award-winning indie horror film Splinter by director Toby Wilkins.

Personnel
JoDee Purkeypile: Lead vocals, Rhythm guitar, Percussion
Sean Crooks: Bass, Backing vocals
Chris Sensat: Drums, Percussion
Brendan Rogers: Piano, Organ
Colin Slagle: Lead guitar

Production Credits
Produced by Mark Hallman and The Alice Rose
Engineer: Ned Stewart
Recorded February-April 2006 at Congress House Studio, Austin, Texas
Mixed and Mastered by Mark Hallman at Congress House Studio.
from the album Phonographic Memory (Emerald Wood Records, 11-10-2006)

References

Songs written for films
2006 songs